George McConnell is an American singer from Vicksburg, Mississippi. He played for the bands Widespread Panic, Kudzu Kings, and Beanland.

History
George McConnell attended the University of Mississippi, where he was in the Sigma Alpha Epsilon fraternity.

McConnell co-founded the band Beanland in Oxford, Mississippi in 1985 with guitarist Bill McCorry. After some early shuffling, the band's line-up comprised McConnell and McCrory on guitar, John Hermann on keyboards, Ron Lewis on bass, and Harry Peel on drums. The band recorded their self-titled debut album in 1991 and toured extensively around the south and southwest, playing blues-oriented rock as part of the nascent early 1990's Jam band renaissance.

McConnell went on to play for several years in the country rock band Kudzu Kings, eventually leaving to devote his time to opening a guitar store in Oxford Square in Oxford, Mississippi.

In 2002, following Widespread Panic guitarist Michael Houser's diagnosis of pancreatic cancer, McConnell and saxophone player Randall Bramblett were asked to accompany the band on their summer tour. Initially, McConnell sat in for a few songs per show to support Houser's playing, however, when Houser was unable to complete the tour, McConnell filled in as the lead guitarist. McConnell was named as the new lead guitarist in the band following Houser's death in August 2002.

McConnell served as Widespread Panic's lead guitarist from 2002 to 2006, recording two studio albums and three live albums with the band. His last show with the band was on July 30, 2006, in St. Louis, Missouri.

In 2008, McConnell began performing with a new band: George McConnell & The Nonchalants, releasing songs exclusive to a website that he hosted which were meant to feel nostalgic.

In 2012, George McConnell was asked to fill in for guitarist John Neff for a series of year-end shows for the Drive-By Truckers.

On March 27, 2014, George McConnell was the subject of the Mississippi Public Broadcasting television show "Oxford Sounds" along with Mississippi heavy metal group The Cooters. The TV show was broadcast statewide on public television. George McConnell & The Nonchalants played three songs on the show, including "A Thousand Things," "Must Not Mind," and the Beanland classic "Doretha," followed by an interview of McConnell by Cooters' frontman Newt Rayburn.

Discography and videography

Beanland
Beanland (1991, HiCool Records) Produced by Jim Dickinson and engineered by Don Smith
Eye to Eye (1993, HiCool Records) Produced and engineered by Don Smith
Rising From the Riverbed – DVD (2004, Cloudscapes Productions) Produced and directed by Scotty Glahn (includes bonus CD sampler of bands from the era)

Kudzu Kings
Kudzu Kings (1997) Produced by Jim Gaines and engineered by Jeffrey Reed
Y2Kow (1999) Produced and engineered by Jeffrey Reed

Widespread Panic
Ball (2003)
Night of Joy (2004)
Über Cobra (2004)
Jackassolantern (2004)
Live at Myrtle Beach (2005)
Earth to America (2006)
Live From The Backyard (2003) (DVD)
Earth to Atlanta (2006) (DVD)

George McConnell
Singles Only (2009)
Cheers, Sports Fans! (2013)

John Hermann
Smiling Assassin (2001)
Defector (2003)

References

Living people
American rock guitarists
American male guitarists
Widespread Panic members
People from Oxford, Mississippi
Musicians from Vicksburg, Mississippi
Guitarists from Mississippi
Year of birth missing (living people)